Julio Ripamonti Base is a Chilean Antarctic research base. It is located on Ardley Island in the South Shetland Islands. The base is located 50 meters above sea level, on a solid rock surface, 100 meters from the sea. Opened in 1982, it can accommodate a crew of four people. The installation consists of four modules. Julio Ripamonti is located near a colony of gentoo penguins.

See also
 List of Antarctic research stations
 List of Antarctic field camps

References

Chilean Antarctic Territory
Outposts of Antarctica
1982 establishments in Antarctica